A sand trap can be:

Bunker (golf), a hazard in the game of golf
Catch points, designed to stop runaway railroad cars
Run-off area, designed to stop runaway race cars